Simon Fokke (1712–1784) was a Dutch designer, etcher, and engraver. Born in Amsterdam, he was a pupil of J. C. Philips, and was chiefly employed by booksellers to engrave small portraits and vignettes. He died in Amsterdam in 1784. His works include:

His own Portrait; after himself.
A View of the Port of Leghorn; after Vernet.
A View near Narni, in Lombardy; after the same.
Six plates of Dutch Views, with Rivers, Ships, and Skaters; after Avercamp.
Several Portraits for Tycho Hofman's Portraits historiques des hommes illustres de Dannemark, 1741.
Several plates of his own design for Wagenaar's Vaderlandsche Historie, 1749–59.
The Treaty of Peace at Münster; after Terborch.
The Prodigal Son; after Spagnoletto; in the Dresden Gallery.
Jacob keeping the Flocks of Laban; after the same; in the Dresden Gallery.
The Death of Dido, a burlesque; after C. Troost.
Vignette of Liberty on the title page of Rousseau's Discourse on Inequality, 1755.

References

External links
 

1712 births
1784 deaths
Engravers from Amsterdam